Swing Dat Hammer is an album by Harry Belafonte, released by RCA Victor (LPM/LSP-2194) in 1960.  It is a collection of chain gang work songs.  The last cut is a collection of workmen conversations.

At the Grammy Awards of 1961 Swing Dat Hammer won the Grammy Award for Best Ethnic or Traditional Folk Recording.

Track listing
"Look Over Yonder" – 2:51
"Bald Headed Woman" – 3:30
"Grizzly Bear" – 3:27
"Diamond Joe" (Belafonte) – 3:36
"Here Rattler, Here" – 3:57
"Another Man Done Gone" (Vera Hall, Alan Lomax, John Lomax, Ruby Pickens Tartt) – 2:21
"Swing Dat Hammer	" – 4:38
"Go Down, Old Hannah" – 3:47
"Rocks and Gravel" – 4:10
"Talkin' an' Signifyin'	" – 5:08

Personnel
Harry Belafonte – vocals
The Belafonte Folk Singers – vocals
Millard Thomas – guitar
Robert De Cormier – conductor

Production notes
Produced by Bob Bollard
Engineered by Bob Simpson

References

1960 albums
Harry Belafonte albums
RCA Victor albums
Albums conducted by Robert De Cormier